Creative Scotland is the development body for the arts and creative industries in Scotland. Based in Edinburgh, it is an executive non-departmental public body of the Scottish Government.

The organisation was created by the passing of the Public Services Reform (Scotland) Act 2010  and inherited the functions of Scottish Screen and the Scottish Arts Council on 1 July 2010. An interim company, Creative Scotland 2009, was set up to assist the transition from the existing organisations.

Creative Scotland has the general functions of:

identifying, supporting and developing quality and excellence in the arts and culture from those engaged in artistic and other creative endeavours,
promoting understanding, appreciation and enjoyment of the arts and culture,
encouraging as many people as possible to access and participate in the arts and culture,
realising, as far as reasonably practicable to do so, the value and benefits (in particular, the national and international value and benefits) of the arts and culture,
encouraging and supporting artistic and other creative endeavours which contribute to an understanding of Scotland's national culture in its broad sense as a way of life,
promoting and supporting industries and other commercial activity the primary focus of which is the application of creative skills.

Since its inception, Creative Scotland has been involved in some controversies, and been challenged by key figures in the arts and film industries in the country. In 2012, 400 artists, writers, playwrights and musicians' protesting of Creative Scotland's management led to the resignation of Creative Scotland's then-chief Andrew Dixon.

In March 2011, Creative Scotland was debated in the Scottish Parliament after suspicious expenditure, such as the funding of £58,000 to finance a dance programme based on the works of Alfred Hitchcock and a trip to Tonga to study Polynesian dancing, was uncovered. 

In January 2015, the organization was lambasted by filmmakers for offering less than half of the money required to a blockbuster film The Rezort wishing to shoot in Scotland, which resulted in the production moving to Wales.

In June 2018 Janet Archer resigned as chief executive of Creative Scotland after joining the organisation in July 2013. She was replaced by deputy chief executive Iain Munro, who assumed the role of chief executive.

Notable critics of Creative Scotland in the Scottish arts world include Liz Lochhead, Don Paterson, Ian Rankin, Andrea Gibb, David Greig, John Byrne, Alasdair Gray and James Kelman.

See also
 Scottish Mortgage Investment Trust Book Awards, organised by Creative Scotland

References

External links

2009 establishments in Scotland
Arts organisations based in Scotland
Government agencies established in 2010
Executive non-departmental public bodies of the Scottish Government
Organisations based in Edinburgh